T-complex protein 1 subunit beta is a protein that in humans is encoded by the CCT2 gene.

Function 

This gene encodes a molecular chaperone that is member of the TRiC complex. This complex consists of two identical stacked rings, each containing eight different proteins. Unfolded polypeptides enter the central cavity of the complex and are folded in an ATP-dependent manner. The complex folds various proteins, including actin and tubulin. Alternate transcriptional splice variants of the gene described in this record have been observed but have not been thoroughly characterized.

Interactions 

CCT2 (gene) has been shown to interact with PPP4C.

References

External links

Further reading